Coalmont is an unincorporated community and census-designated place in Lewis Township, Clay County, Indiana, United States. It is part of the Terre Haute Metropolitan Statistical Area. As of the 2010 census it had a population of 402.

History
A post office was established at Coalmont in 1901.  Deposits of coal in the area caused the name to be selected.

Geography
Its western border is the Sullivan County line. Indiana State Road 159 runs north–south through the center of the community, and IN 48 forms the southern edge of the CDP. Shakamak State Park is directly to the south.

Demographics

References

Census-designated places in Clay County, Indiana
Census-designated places in Indiana
Terre Haute metropolitan area